Christopher "Cris" Brown is an Australian freestyle wrestler who competed at five Olympics from 1980 to 1996. His best result was fourth at the 1984 Olympics when he lost in the bronze medal match of the Featherweight class to South Korean Lee Jung-Keun.

Brown was later banned for life by an AOC panel from representing Australia in the Olympics as he twice breached their rules on doping.

Brown has participated in Submission Wrestling and MMA matches, scoring a win over Renzo Gracie in an ADCC tournament.

He also fought notable Cuban fighter Hector Lombard with a no contest result due to an illegal headbutt by Lombard.

He coaches and trains at Adrenaline MMA and fitness in Cheltenham, Melbourne.

References

External links
Sports-Reference Profile

1959 births
Living people
Sportspeople from Melbourne
Olympic wrestlers of Australia
Wrestlers at the 1980 Summer Olympics
Wrestlers at the 1984 Summer Olympics
Wrestlers at the 1988 Summer Olympics
Wrestlers at the 1992 Summer Olympics
Wrestlers at the 1996 Summer Olympics
Australian male sport wrestlers
Commonwealth Games silver medallists for Australia
Wrestlers at the 1982 Commonwealth Games
Commonwealth Games medallists in wrestling
Medallists at the 1982 Commonwealth Games